Lady Macbeth is a 2016 British drama film directed by William Oldroyd, produced by Fodhla Cronin O'Reilly and written by Alice Birch, based on the novella Lady Macbeth of the Mtsensk District by Nikolai Leskov, though the film's ending deviates significantly from the source text. It stars Florence Pugh, Cosmo Jarvis, Paul Hilton, Naomi Ackie and Christopher Fairbank. The plot follows a young woman who is stifled by her loveless marriage to a bitter man twice her age.

The film had its world premiere at the Toronto International Film Festival on 10 September 2016, and was released in the United Kingdom on 28 April 2017 by Altitude Film Distribution and in the United States on 14 July 2017 by Roadside Attractions. It received positive reviews and has grossed over $5 million worldwide.

Plot
In 1865, Katherine (Pugh) is in a loveless marriage to an older man, Alexander Lester (Hilton). They live at the estate of Alexander's father, Boris, in rural Northumberland in the North East of England. Katherine is forced to maintain a strict schedule and prevented from leaving the house. Boris scolds her for not giving Alexander a son, but Alexander's sexual interest in his wife seems to be limited to watching her naked body and masturbating whilst observing. One day, both Boris and Alexander have to leave the estate for separate business matters, leaving Katherine alone with the housemaid, Anna. For the first time in memory, she is free to explore the area to alleviate her boredom.

Katherine discovers Anna being suspended from the ceiling of an outbuilding in a sheet by the men who work on the land. They say they are weighing a sow. Katherine has the woman released. She is attracted to one of the men, Sebastian, and the next day sets herself up to meet him. When Sebastian comes to the house to visit Katherine, they begin an affair. Anna informs the local priest, who attempts to warn Katherine, but she sends him away. When Boris returns home, he finds his favourite wine has run out. He accuses Anna of drinking it and tells her to get on the floor on all fours: if she behaves as an animal, she will be treated as an animal. Katherine says nothing. Boris is later informed of the affair, beats Sebastian and locks him in a stable. He strikes Katherine when she demands his release. Katherine then poisons his food, and calmly makes small talk with Anna as he chokes to death in the next room.

Anna is terrified into muteness, and Boris is buried without suspicion. Katherine takes over the estate, and she and Sebastian continue their affair openly. One night, while they are asleep in Katherine's marital bed, she awakes to realise that Alexander has returned home. After he reveals that he is aware of the infidelity, Katherine summons Sebastian and they start to have sex in front of him. A fight ensues, during which Katherine kills Alexander. The couple bury Alexander's body in the woods and kill his horse. They are not directly accused of the murder, and Sebastian begins to dress and behave as the lord of the manor himself.

A woman named Agnes arrives at the estate with a young boy named Teddy, who she claims is the product of an affair between Alexander and her daughter. Katherine reluctantly shelters the pair. Sebastian, angry at the change in living arrangements, returns to the outbuilding. Katherine realises she is pregnant, but is unable to inform Sebastian. She also begins to bond with Teddy. When Teddy disappears after Katherine scolds him, Sebastian finds the boy sitting over a waterfall and rescues him. When he returns Teddy to the house, he admits that he considered pushing him. Katherine dissuades Sebastian from leaving, promising to do anything he wants in return.

While Teddy's grandmother is asleep, the couple use the opportunity to smother Teddy. Sebastian hides in the woods while Katherine claims that Teddy died in his sleep. The village doctor is sceptical of the story, but while the issue is being discussed, a guilt-ridden Sebastian returns from the woods and confesses everything. Katherine turns Sebastian's confession back on him, and accuses him of committing all of the murders with Anna. Her word is taken over his, especially when Anna remains mute. As Sebastian and Anna are taken away by the police, the remaining servants leave and Katherine remains alone in the house with her unborn child.

Cast

Production
In September 2015, it was announced Florence Pugh, Cosmo Jarvis, Christopher Fairbank, Naomi Ackie and Paul Hilton had been cast in the film, with William Oldroyd directing from a screenplay by Alice Birch.

Release
The film had its world premiere at the Toronto International Film Festival on 10 September 2016. Shortly after, Roadside Attractions and Altitude Film Distribution acquired US and UK distribution rights to the film, respectively. It went onto screen at the BFI London Film Festival on 14 October 2016 and the Sundance Film Festival on 20 January 2017.

The film was released in the United Kingdom on 28 April 2017 and in the United States on 14 July 2017.

Reception

Critical response
On review aggregator website Rotten Tomatoes, the film has an approval rating of 88% based on 198 reviews, with a weighted average of 7.6/10. The website's critical consensus reads, "Lady Macbeth flashes some surprising toughness beneath its period exterior, bolstered by a mesmerizing – and unforgiving – central performance by Florence Pugh." On Metacritic, which assigns an average rating to reviews, the film has a weighted score of 76 out of 100, based on 37 critics, indicating "generally favorable reviews".

Guy Lodge of Variety said "Florence Pugh announces herself as a major talent to watch in William Oldroyd's impressively tough-minded Victorian tragedy." David Friend of The Canadian Press calls Pugh's performance "a revelation" and "a striking portrayal of a woman on the brink."

Peter Bradshaw of The Guardian gave the film 5 out of 5 stars, describing it as "a brilliantly chilling subversion of a classic" and "smart, sexy, dour" and Pugh's performance as "lethally charismatic … both sphinx and minx".

Mick LaSalle of The San Francisco Chronicle writes "Oldroyd's approach to Lady Macbeth guarantees some longueurs as the film wears on. But the clarity with which Pugh and Oldroyd communicate Katherine's thoughts and motives maintains a solid interest throughout."

Accolades

References

External links 
 
 

2016 films
British drama films
BBC Film films
Roadside Attractions films
Films based on works by Nikolai Leskov
Films based on Russian novels
2016 directorial debut films
2016 drama films
Films produced by Fodhla Cronin O'Reilly
2010s English-language films
2010s British films